Valby Maskinfabrik is a former industrial site now under conversion into a mixed-use neighbourhood in the Valby district of Copenhagen, Denmark. It is located at the corner of Vigerslev Allé and Gammel Køge Landevej.

History

F.L. Smidth was founded by Frederik Læssøe Smidth in 1882 and the company was initially based in his mother's house in Frederiksberg. In 1898 the company acquired a circa 25 ha area south of the village of Valby to build its own machine factory. The site was used for manufacturing machinery for the concrete industry. In 1950, it was the workplace of 2,000 workers. The area was decommissioned as a manufacturing site in the early 1990s. De Forenede Ejendomsselskaber acquired most of the site in 2001.

Redevelopment
The masterplan for the area was designed by Arkitema Architects. It comprises approximately 1,200 apartments and 40,000 square metres of office space.

Street names
Streets in the area are named after Danish actors and actresses. Names include:
 Axel Strøbyes Vej  after Axel Strøbye
 Bodil Ipsens Vej  after Bodil Ipsen
 Buster Larsens Vej  after Buster Larsen
 Clara Pontoppidans Vej after Clara Pontoppidan
 Ebbe Rodes Allé  after Ebbe Rode
 Ib Schønbergs Allé  after Ib Schønberg
 Karin Nellemoses Vej after Karin Nellemose
 Kirsten Walthers Vej after Kirsten Walther
 Lily Brobergs Vej  after Lily Broberg
 Lise Ringheims Vej after  Lise Ringheim
 Poul Bundgaards Vej after Poul Bundgaard 
 Poul Reichhardts Vej  after Poul Reichhardt
 Tove Maës Vej  after Tove Maës

Transport
Valby station is located just north of the area. Vigerslev Allé station is located approximately 500 metres to the west of the area and Ny Ellebjerg station is located approximately 900 metres to the south of the area.

References

External links 

 Official website
 Valby Maskinfabrik at DBS' website

Valby